Darren Flanigan (born 8 March 1962) is a former Australian rules footballer who played with Geelong and St Kilda in the Victorian and Australian Football Leagues.

Flanigan came to Geelong from the Victorian town of Katamatite and during the early 1980s acted as their back up ruckman. He got more regular game time in 1985, the same year he was named in Victoria's interstate team. In 1989 Flanigan appeared in the VFL Grand Final, coming off the bench in the loss to Hawthorn. He finished his career with a season at St Kilda in 1992.

Flanigan is currently the AFL Victoria female football manager.

References

Holmesby, Russell and Main, Jim (2007). The Encyclopedia of AFL Footballers. 7th ed. Melbourne: Bas Publishing.

1962 births
Living people
Australian rules footballers from Victoria (Australia)
Geelong Football Club players
St Kilda Football Club players